The 2022 East Carolina Pirates football team represented East Carolina University during the 2022 NCAA Division I FBS football season. The Pirates played their home games at Dowdy-Ficklen Stadium in Greenville, North Carolina, and competed as members of the American Athletic Conference. They were led by head coach Mike Houston, in his fourth season.

Schedule
The Pirates will host the three of their non-conference opponents, NC State from the ACC, Old Dominion from Conference USA and Campbell from Division I FCS. They will visit BYU from the FBS Independents

Game summaries

vs No. 13 NC State

vs Old Dominion

vs Campbell

vs Navy

at South Florida

at Tulane

vs Memphis

vs UCF

at BYU

at Cincinnati

vs Houston

at Temple

vs Coastal Carolina (Birmingham Bowl)

Notes

References

East Carolina
East Carolina Pirates football seasons
Birmingham Bowl champion seasons
East Carolina Pirates football